Spirit the Earth Aflame is the third album of the Irish black metal band Primordial.  It was originally released in 2000.

Track listing

Credits
Alan Averill - Vocals 
Ciáran MacUiliam - Guitar 
Feargal Flannery - Guitar
Pól "Paul" MacAmlaigh - Bass
Simon O'Laoghaire - Drums

References

Primordial (band) albums
2000 albums
Hammerheart Records albums